Capital punishment is a legal process whereby a person is put to death by the government.

Capital Punishment may also refer to:

 Capital Punishment (Big Pun album), 1998
 Capital Punishment (Unit:187 album), 2003
 Capital Punishment (film), a 1925 silent film melodrama

See also
 Capitol Punishment (book), a 2011 book about corruption in American politics
 Capitol Punishment: The Megadeth Years, an album by Megadeth
 WWE Capitol Punishment, a 2011 professional wrestling pay-per-view event